Goodbye Cold Nights is an EP by Seirom, independently released on February 2, 2013.

Track listing

Personnel
Adapted from the Goodbye Cold Nights liner notes.
 Maurice de Jong (as Mories) – vocals, instruments, recording, cover art

Release history

References

External links 
 
 Goodbye Cold Nights at Bandcamp

2013 EPs
Seirom albums